Barsovo is a rural locality (a settlement) in Pershinskoye Rural Settlement, Kirzhachsky District, Vladimir Oblast, Russia. The population was 1,030 as of 2010. There are 2 streets.

Geography 
Barsovo is located 12 km south of Kirzhach (the district's administrative centre) by road. Ileykino is the nearest rural locality.

References 

Rural localities in Kirzhachsky District